Cobblestone House is a historic home located at Cazenovia, New York in Madison County, New York.  It is a cobblestone building built in the Greek Revival style about 1840. It consists of a 2-story main block flanked by a -story service wing.  It is built of coursed rounded stones set in mortar. Also on the property is a contributing carriage house.

It was listed on the National Register of Historic Places in 1987.

References

Houses on the National Register of Historic Places in New York (state)
Cobblestone architecture
Greek Revival houses in New York (state)
Houses completed in 1840
Houses in Madison County, New York
National Register of Historic Places in Cazenovia, New York